"The Carnival Is Over" is a song written by Tom Springfield, for the Australian folk pop group the Seekers.  It is based on a Russian folk song from circa 1883, adapted with original English-language lyrics. The song became the Seekers' signature recording, and the band have customarily closed their concerts with it ever since its success in late-1965.

At its 1965 sales peak, the Seekers' single was selling 93,000 copies per day in the UK with sales of at least 1.41 million copies in the UK alone. It also stopped The Who from getting to No.1 with "My Generation". The single spent three weeks at No.1 in the UK Singles Chart in November and December 1965.

The song also topped the Australian charts (for six weeks, from 4 December 1965), and reached No.1 in the Irish Charts for two weeks.

The music
"The Carnival is Over" was the third hit single written for The Seekers by Tom Springfield, following the success of "I'll Never Find Another You" (1964) and "A World of Our Own" (1965).

Stenka Razin

The main tune of "The Carnival is Over" is adapted from a Russian song about the Cossack ataman Stenka Razin which became popular in Russia in the 1890s. The original poem of "Stenka Razin" was written in 1883 by the poet and Povolzhye region ethnographer Dmitry Sadovnikov. The text of this poem, with minor changes, was set to the music of a popular Russian folk melody by an unknown author.

It told about an episode of the 1670–1671 Russian Peasant Uprising in which Razin allegedly killed his captive, a beautiful Persian Princess whom he had just married. Razin throws the Princess into the Volga river from his boat, in a gesture addressed to his disgruntled jealous comrades who accuse him of "mellowing down" after just one night spent with a woman.

Score:

The song gave the title to the famous 1938 Soviet musical comedy Volga-Volga. It was performed by the Osipov State Russian Folk Orchestra (balalaikas and domras) during their 1967 tour of Australia. It is played to symbolic effect by the band in a cafe in the 1988 film The Unbearable Lightness of Being after Soviet tanks have crushed the Prague Spring.

The American folk singer Pete Seeger wrote an English language version of "Stenka Razin" called "River of My Country" in the 1950s. This song was included in his album Love Songs for Friends and Foes (1956). The lyrics were not a translation of the Russian song, but were newly composed by Seeger himself, while maintaining the motif of the river.

The Seekers version
Tom Springfield was introduced to the song "Stenka Razin" at the Joint Services School for Linguists during his National Service (1952–54). The school was known as “the Russian course”, and its purpose was to train conscripts in intelligence techniques. Springfield joined the school’s Russian choir, and they sang "Stenka Razin" together (in Russian) as part of the course.

Springfield adapted the folk song melody in two significant ways. He altered the time signature from 3/4 to 4/4, and he added a chorus, allowing him to expand the Song structure to AABABA from the simple AAA structure of the original.  His decision to base his third song for the Seekers on the haunting Russian melody proved to be "a gold mine".   Early in 1965, Springfield travelled to Brazil, where he witnessed the Carnival in Rio. This provided the basis for his new lyrics, including the Commedia del'arte characters Pierrot and Columbine, who feature in the chorus. The song depicts "the joys of love" experienced by Pierrot and Columbine - when they have to part, the carnival is over.

Boney M. version

The German band Boney M. released their cover version of the Seekers' song in 1982 under the title "The Carnival Is Over (Goodbye True Lover)". The song featured Liz Mitchell on lead vocal, and included a new original verse by producer Frank Farian and lyricist Catherine Courage to introduce Reggie Tsiboe as a vocalist following the departure of Bobby Farrell from the band. Despite reaching No.11 in the Swiss charts, the single was widely considered Boney M.'s first flop.

Farian attempted to remedy this failure by producing a number of shorter versions, culminating in a release for the Japanese market in which Reggie Tsiboe's interpolated verse was eliminated. This can be found on "Their Most Beautiful Ballads" (2001) - it had no more success than previous versions.

Nick Cave version
Nick Cave & the Bad Seeds covered the Seekers' version of "The Carnival is Over" on their 1986 album "Kicking Against The Pricks". This was the third album released by the Australian rock band. Remarking on the song selection on the Album, Cave said:

References

External links
 The Carnival Is Over (1965 version) at seekerslyrics.net

1965 singles
Irish Singles Chart number-one singles
Songs written by Tom Springfield
UK Singles Chart number-one singles
1883 songs
Columbia Graphophone Company singles
Hansa Records singles